The Under 15 Regionalliga Süd (German: C-Jugend Regionalliga Süd) is the highest level of competition for under 15 football teams in Baden-Württemberg and Hesse and the first tier of the German football league system in Southern Germany as there is no Bundesliga or German Championship organised at this level.

The competition is organised by the Southern German football association, the SFV.

History
The league was introduced in 2010 as the last of the five Regionalligas in Germany at this age level. Previous to the introduction of the Regionalliga local leagues were played in Southern Germany with a Southern German Championship contested by the best clubs at the end of the season. The league initially operated with 12 teams but was expanded to 14 at the end of the 2012–13 season.

In the 2014–15 season VfB Stuttgart won the league, remaining undefeated all season and winning 22 out of 26 games.

Feeder leagues
Three clubs are relegated every season from the league, except in 2012–13 when it was only one because of the league expansion. In turn three clubs are promoted to the league every season, the champions of each of the three states or, if ineligible, the highest placed eligible team. The Regionalliga has four feeder leagues as the Bavarian league is subdivided into a northern and southern division:
 Hessenliga
 Bayernliga North
 Bayernliga South
 Oberliga Baden-Württemberg

Champions
The league champions:

League placings
The placings in the league:

Top scorers
The league's top scorers:

References

External links 
 Southern German football association website 

Youth football in Germany
2010 establishments in Germany
Regionalliga